Blade Runner is a 1982 American neo-noir science fiction film directed by Ridley Scott, which stars Harrison Ford, Rutger Hauer, Sean Young, and Edward James Olmos. Written by Hampton Fancher and David Peoples, the film is an adaptation of the 1968 novel Do Androids Dream of Electric Sheep? by Philip K. Dick. 

Its 2017 sequel, Blade Runner 2049, stars Ryan Gosling and Harrison Ford, with Ana de Armas, Sylvia Hoeks, Robin Wright, Mackenzie Davis, Carla Juri, Lennie James, Dave Bautista and Jared Leto.

Characters in both films

Rick Deckard 

Rick Deckard is a "blade runner", a special agent in the Los Angeles police department employed to hunt down and "retire" replicants. His ID number is B-263-54, which is stated twice in both the 1992 Director's Cut and the 25th-anniversary Final Cut of the film.

He is the protagonist of the film and the narrator in the original theatrical release.

Agent Deckard was played by Harrison Ford.

Gaff 
Gaff is a Los Angeles police officer who escorts Deckard throughout his mission. He primarily uses "Cityspeak", a creole of Spanish, French, German, Hungarian, Chinese, and Japanese, which Deckard pretends not to understand. Gaff is never shown participating in Deckard's investigation, preferring to linger in the background crafting origami figures; he appears to have an ambivalent attitude towards the replicants, observing "the other man's dead, Deckard... it's a shame she won't live".

Gaff was played by American actor/director Edward James Olmos.

The sequel novel to Do Androids Dream of Electric Sheep? by K. W. Jeter mentions that Gaff is killed in the line of duty. At the beginning of the novel, Bryant has just returned from the funeral and expresses his distaste for the Cityspeak written on Gaff's headstone.

In the sequel film, Blade Runner 2049, Gaff is questioned by Officer K (Ryan Gosling) in a retirement home asking about Deckard's whereabouts.

Rachael 

Rachael, sometimes referred to as Rachael Tyrell, was the latest experiment of Eldon Tyrell, and the sole Nexus-7 replicant. He believed that since the replicants had such a limited lifespan, they had little time to develop control of their emotions, causing difficulty in managing these emotions. He believed implanting the replicants with memories would create a cushion that would allow for emotional development, and make them more controllable.

Rachael has the implanted memories of Lilith Tyrell, Tyrell's niece, and Rachael is then led to believe that she is human. It is not revealed in the film how long she has been living, but Tyrell admits that he thinks she is beginning to suspect the truth of her nature.

Tyrell refuses to discuss the issue with Rachael. In desperation, she turns to Deckard, who has been told by Captain Bryant to retire her. However, he falls in love with her instead.

At the end of the film, the four replicants Deckard had been assigned to kill are dead. Rachael and Deckard then flee and presumably go into hiding to have a future together.

In Blade Runner 2049 it is revealed Rachael, as the sole Nexus-7, was given the ability to reproduce by Tyrell. During an apparently routine investigation, Blade Runner Officer K uncovers a box containing bones and hair buried under a tree. The remains are shown to be that of a being who died after a caesarean section, and upon the discovery that the being was a replicant, K is ordered by Lt. Joshi to track down and kill the replicant's child. K later learns the pregnant replicant was Rachael. After capturing Deckard, Niander Wallace designs a physically near-identical copy of Rachael and offers her to Deckard in an attempt to persuade Deckard to reveal the location of the replicants who helped hide his and Rachael's daughter. After Deckard declines, Wallace has the copy killed.

Rachael was played by Sean Young in Blade Runner. In Blade Runner 2049, Rachael was portrayed by actress Loren Peta with Sean Young's facial features de-aged and overlaid via CGI.

Characters in Blade Runner

Roy Batty 

Roy Batty is the leader of the renegade Nexus-6 replicants and the main antagonist of the film. He was activated on January 8, 2016, which makes him 3 years and 10 months old by the time of the events of the film. He is highly intelligent, fast and skilled at combat and yet still learning how to deal with emotions. With an A Physical Level (superhuman strength & endurance) and an A Mental Level (genius-level intellect), he is probably the most dangerous of the fugitive replicants. He is a combat model, used off-world for military service. He and five other replicants come to Earth hoping to find a way to lengthen their lifespan. He is able to use J. F. Sebastian to get a meeting with Tyrell, the founder of the company and his creator. Tyrell refers to him as his "prodigal son" and tells him his life cannot be extended but he should revel in the life that he has, as he has done and seen things others could only dream of. Batty kills Tyrell and Sebastian.

Deckard retires the remaining replicants and is hunted by a dying Roy. Deckard ends up dangling from a building and is saved from the fall by Roy. As he dies, Roy tells Deckard about the things he has seen and how the memories will be "lost in time, like tears in rain". He smiles, saying, "Time... to die". In the novel, Do Androids Dream of Electric Sheep?, his name was spelled "Roy Baty" and was the leader of the eight replicants who killed their human owners so that they could escape their life of slavery on Mars. Roy was married to Irmgard Baty, another replicant. In the novel, Roy's relationship with Pris (who was his lover in the film) is only one of friendship. In the novel Blade Runner 2: The Edge of Human (written by K. W. Jeter after Dick's death, incorporating elements from the novel and the screenplay), Batty is one of a series of replicants based on a mercenary of the same name. The template suffered from "neural malformation", which made them unable to experience fear. This might be a reason why replicants of that series were so difficult to kill. Roy Batty was played by Rutger Hauer.

Harry Bryant 
Harry Bryant is the captain of the Rep-Detect department of the Los Angeles Police Department. His job in the film is to deal with a group of escaped Nexus-6 replicants (whom he refers to as "skinjobs") that have landed on Earth. His top Blade Runner, Holden, was in hospital on a medical ventilator after an encounter with the Leon replicant, earlier in the film. Bryant uses thinly-veiled threats against Rick Deckard, a retired Blade Runner, to enlist his aid. Deckard's narration in the original theatrical version compares Bryant to the racist cops of the past.

Capt. Bryant was played by M. Emmet Walsh.

Hannibal Chew 
Hannibal Chew contracts for the Tyrell Corporation as a genetic engineer. His job is to create the eyes for the replicants, Roy's and Leon's, in this case.

In the film, the replicants visit him while he is working in a freezer. The replicants pressure him into telling them that J. F. Sebastian can get them into Tyrell's inner sanctum.

He was played by American actor James Hong.

Dave Holden 
Dave Holden is the Blade Runner testing new employees at the Tyrell Corporation on the premise that the escaped Replicants might try to infiltrate the company.

During a Voight-Kampff test, Leon shoots Holden and leaves him for dead. Later, Bryant mentions that Holden is alive, but his breathing is assisted by machines.

There were two hospital scenes with Holden and Deckard that were filmed, but not used in the movie. One scene is shown in the documentary On the Edge of Blade Runner. Both scenes appear in the deleted scenes section on the Blade Runner Special Edition DVD.

He was played by Morgan Paull.

Leon Kowalski 

Leon Kowalski is a replicant who came to Earth with five others looking to extend their lives. He has an A physical level, which means he has superhuman strength and endurance (according to the Final Cut he was used to load nuclear-heads in the outer space colonies and for front-line soldier duty). Leon is classified mental level C. He does not have the speed of thought that Roy does when it comes to solving problems. He was activated on April 10, 2017, making him 2 years and 7 months old by the time of the film.

Leon tries to infiltrate the Tyrell Corporation as an employee and undergoes a Voight-Kampff test designed to detect replicants. Confused by the questions, he shoots the tester, Dave Holden. Leon attacks Deckard on the street after seeing him kill Zhora, but is stopped when Rachael shoots him with Deckard's gun.

Leon cherishes photographs of his friends. Unlike Rachael's false photos of her childhood, these include current photos of people who mean something to him.

Leon Kowalski was played by Brion James.

Taffey Lewis 
Taffey Lewis is the owner of Taffey's Snake Pit Bar. The bar features music, exotic dancing, and something being smoked in pipes. He dismisses Deckard's threats with a free drink.

He was played by Hy Pyke.

Pris Stratton 

Pris Stratton is a "basic pleasure model" incepted on Valentine's Day, 2016, making her the second-oldest of the four fugitive replicants at three years, nine months. She is the girlfriend of Roy Batty and is responsible for gaining J. F. Sebastian's trust. At an A-Physical Level, she is shown to have superhuman endurance (as in the scene where she grabs a boiling egg with her bare hand without harm) and an affinity for gymnastics. Her B-Mental Level puts her at a lower intellectual level than Roy, but higher than Leon. She sets a trap for Deckard in the Bradbury Building, disguising herself as one of Sebastian's toys and then attacking Deckard with her gymnastic skills. As she rushes Deckard for another attack, he kills her.

Her surname, Stratton, appears in the novel, Do Androids Dream of Electric Sheep?, but is never used in the film.

Her punk outfits were inspired by a new wave calendar.

It is suggested in Blade Runner 2: The Edge of Human that Pris was actually an insane human woman who believed that she was a female replicant, although this has nothing to do with the original Blade Runner since it was from a different author.

She was played by Daryl Hannah.

J.F. Sebastian 
J.F. Sebastian is a genetic designer working for Tyrell. He is not allowed to emigrate off-world because he has Methuselah Syndrome. Because of this, he ages faster and has a shorter lifespan, something he has in common with the replicants. He is only 25 years old, but his physical appearance is of a middle-aged man. With the Bradbury Building all to himself, he makes the most of his considerable talents creating automata companions. He is loosely based on the character J. R. Isidore from the novel.

He is approached by Pris, whom Sebastian takes in because he thinks she is homeless, and Roy comes to stay with him soon after. Roy and Pris point out that because of his condition, Sebastian has much in common with them, and argue that if they do not get Tyrell's help to extend their lives, Pris will soon die.
Sebastian is playing correspondence chess with Tyrell, and Roy suggests a bold move which gives rise to an opportunity to visit Tyrell and smuggle Roy in.
When Tyrell claims that he cannot extend Roy's life, Roy kills him.

Sebastian is seen running away from Roy, who then descends the elevator alone. A police radio message heard by Deckard after Tyrell is killed states that Sebastian's body was also discovered by the police with Tyrell's at the Tyrell Corporation.

The makeup for Sebastian was a "stretch and stipple" technique with no prosthetics.

He was played by William Sanderson.

Dr. Eldon Tyrell 
Dr. Eldon Tyrell is the CEO and founder of Tyrell Corporation. His creations are Replicants, some of whom have been given away as an incentive for people to emigrate to the Off-World colonies. Others are used in combat to protect those settlers. Roy Batty, along with J. F. Sebastian, finds Tyrell, and asks him to extend his life beyond the four-year limit built into Nexus-6 replicants. However, Tyrell claims this request is impossible to satisfy due to the inherent instabilities of replicant genetics. Upon hearing this, Batty kisses Tyrell before gouging out his eyes and crushing his skull with his bare hands.

He was played by Joe Turkel.

Zhora Salome 

Zhora Salome is a replicant with an A Physical Level (super-human endurance) and a B Mental Level (intelligence equal to that of Pris), and has been used in murder squads. She was activated on June 12, 2016, making her 3 years and 5 months old. She gets a job as an exotic dancer at Taffey's Bar, with the actress using her own pet snake. Deckard tracks her down at Taffey's after finding her snake's scale, and she soon realizes that he is dangerous. She attacks him, but Deckard narrowly escapes death when people walk in just before she delivers a killing blow. Zhora tries to escape by running into a busy street, but Deckard chases her and finally shoots her in the back, "retiring" her.

She was played by Joanna Cassidy.

Unnamed replicant(s) 
According to dialogue spoken by Bryant in the Final Cut of the film, two other unnamed replicants (only one in earlier versions) were killed while attempting to enter the Tyrell Corporation. The term used by him when describing their deaths ("Two of them got fried running through an electrical field") suggests they were stopped by an electrical barrier or security device of some sort. (In the theatrical cut of the film, the spoken line is "One of them got fried running through an electrical field" leaving one replicant unaccounted for.)

Earlier drafts of the script name these replicants as Hodge and Mary. In Hampton Fancher's early drafts of the script, Mary lives and Hodge is the only replicant fried in the electrical field. Mary was intended to reflect the novel's character of Irmgard Baty, and was meant to be a "mother figure" model of replicant, performing housework and childcare duties, and she was supposed to be reminiscent of the stereotypical housewife of the 1950s. Her incept date is given as November 1, 2017. Mary was to be played by Stacey Nelkin, who had originally tried out for the role of Pris, but Mary's scenes were cut before filming.

Characters in Blade Runner 2049

K 

KD6-3.7 ("K" for short) is a Nexus-9 replicant model created to obey and works as a "blade runner" for the LAPD, hunting down and "retiring" rogue older model replicants. K is aware he is a replicant, and like the rest of his line, was programmed with implanted memories to aid his mental stability—though the new model replicants are fully aware that these fake memories never really happened, to them or other people, but are fictional fabrications. In contrast to Deckard in the first film, a human blade runner who suspects that what he thinks are his real memories might actually be implanted, K is a replicant blade runner, who begins to suspect that his implanted memories are actually real. When he begins to suspect that he may be Rachael's child, and thus a "real" person, Joi suggests that he needs a real name and picks "Joe" for him. Both the name "K" and the nickname "Joe" are allusions to Franz Kafka's existential novel The Trial.

Officer K was played by Ryan Gosling.

Joi 

Joi is an artificial intelligence projected as a hologram, designed and commercially sold by Wallace Corporation to be a fully customizable live-in romantic companion. K, an artificial intelligence himself, has a Joi copy but treats her as a person, and tries to have a real romantic relationship with her, while wondering about how "real" it can truly be given that she is programmed to like him. K obtains a mobile "emanator" unit for her at the beginning of the film, a control unit or hologram projector which he can transport in his coat, allowing Joi to accompany him anywhere in the world. Joi is nonetheless intangible and cannot physically interact with her surroundings. Played by Ana de Armas.

Niander Wallace 

Niander Wallace (Jared Leto) is the sinister CEO and founder of Wallace Corporation, which dominates replicant production in 2049. A genius genetic engineer, his genetically modified crops and livestock solved a global food crisis – which then gave him enough wealth and political clout to lift the ban on replicant production. Wallace bought out the bankrupt Tyrell Corporation (which had collapsed after several revolts by Nexus-8 replicants).  Wallace improved the genetic programming of his new "Nexus-9" replicants to the point that they cannot disobey the orders of humans, even if the order is to commit suicide. By 2049, Wallace Corporation has revitalized the replicant industry and is a major mega-corporation with numerous other subsidiaries in other fields, such as Joi unit digital AI holograms.  

Wallace is blind, but uses cybernetic implants in his neck to interact with various computers and "see" through flying miniature camera units.  

The secret of making replicants that can reproduce died with Tyrell, and Wallace is obsessed with learning it. By 2049, Earth is suffering from resource depletion and heavy pollution, and it was Wallace's genetically modified foods and new replicants that not only staved off extinction, but allowed humanity to spread to the off-world colonies. Nonetheless, Wallace is frustrated that humanity has only spread to nine other planets, when he wants to see it explode across thousands of planets in the galaxy. Lacking the capacity to build enough replicants for such an endeavor, Wallace is convinced that replicants capable of reproduction on their own are the answer.

Ana Stelline 

Dr. Ana Stelline (Carla Juri) is a scientist who designs the implanted memories that Wallace Corporation installs into its new replicants: the replicants are aware that these memories are implants they did not personally experience, but their presence drastically improves their mental stability. Empathetic to how replicants are used as slave-labor, Ana tries to give them pleasant memories to carry with them, even if they know they're artificial. Due to the complications that can arise, it is forbidden to base memory implants on the real memories of another person: they must be fabrications with no basis in real events. Nonetheless, Dr. Stelline secretly sneaks in a few of her best memories into some of the memory implants, as a gift. Ana actually does not directly work for Wallace Corporation: her "Stelline Corporation" is an independent sub-contractor (Wallace offered to buy her out, but she says she "enjoys her creative freedom").  

Ostensibly, Dr. Stelline developed an immune system deficiency as a child, and has spent the past two decades living in a sterile clean-room in her company's compound, keeping her in seclusion from the outside world. Secretly, Ana is actually the daughter of Deckard and Rachael: living proof that replicants can be capable of reproducing on their own (and making Ana at least part-replicant through her mother). The replicant underground hid her as an infant and scrambled the records, seeing her birth as a miracle and Ana as their savior.

K comes to Ana's lab to investigate the wooden horse he found, which was in his allegedly fake memory implant. She confirms that it is a real memory, but not who it is from – either K or someone else. The wooden horse was a gift from Deckard to his child, later etched with the child's birth date (the same day that Rachael died, from her grave marker). K suspects the memory of the horse is his own, and he is Rachael's son, but when he meets the replicant underground they reveal that Rachael's child was female. K then realizes that Ana was Rachael's child and it was her memory of the horse – because the best memories she gives to replicants like K are actually based on her own.

Luv 

Luv (Sylvia Hoeks) is a Nexus-9 replicant and personal assistant to Niander Wallace. He entrusts her as his right-hand agent running day-to-day affairs over Wallace Corporation. As KD6-3.7 notes, Wallace was fond enough of her to give her a name (and not just a serial number like he has). She also acts as his personal enforcer, ruthlessly killing police officers in the search for Rachael's child. Luv has an outer air of poise, but with a powerful fury simmering barely underneath.

Freysa Sadeghpour 

Freysa Sadeghpour (Hiam Abbass) is the leader of the replicant underground. Apparently an older Nexus-8 model, she took care of the baby after Rachael died in childbirth (K recognizes her in a photo of the baby from around 2022). Freysa helped to hide Rachael's child and erase the records of its past, but is organizing the underground to one day lead another replicant revolt. At some undisclosed point, Freysa lost her right eye: as seen with Sapper Morton, blade runners by this time remove the right eye of replicants as proof of a successful retirement (death), due to having a serial number embedded below the iris. Whether someone cut out Freysa's eye and left her for dead, or perhaps she cut out her own eye so she cannot be identified, is left unexplained.  

Freysa sends Mariette to keep tabs on K, and later saves K after Luv's team from Wallace Corp. captures Deckard. She explains the stakes of the situation to K and her past with Rachael's child, causing him to realize that it is actually Ana. Freysa warns K that if Wallace is able to interrogate Deckard and capture Rachael's child all will be lost, and urges K to kill Deckard before that can happen. K, however, saves Deckard while managing to fake Deckard's death by drowning in the ocean.

Sapper Morton 

Sapper Morton (Dave Bautista) is an older Nexus-8 replicant, living in seclusion on a protein farm in the industrial outliers of Los Angeles. Despite his large size and strength, he is polite and well-read, collecting antique books. Morton used to be an army medic on the off-world colonies in several campaigns. K's encounter to "retire" him starts off the events of the film, as it leads K to discover Rachael's skeletal remains buried on Morton's farm. Morton was a member of the replicant underground and, along with Freysa, helped hide Deckard and Rachael's baby – whose birth Morton describes as "a miracle". Using his army medic training, Morton personally conducted an emergency C-section on Rachael to save her baby after Rachael died in childbirth. Morton is contemptuous that K, a replicant himself, is a blade runner hunting his own kind (though K points out that he is a Nexus-9, not the same model as him).

Mariette

Mariette (Mackenzie Davis) is a replicant prostitute, and secretly a member of the replicant underground. Joi wants to experience sex with K, but the holographic projection of her AI lacks physical substance, so she hires Mariette to have sex with him – while overlaying her projection on Mariette's body. Secretly, Freysa instructs Mariette to keep tabs on K by slipping a tracking device into his coat, which enables the replicant underground to save him after Wallace's agents assault him and capture Deckard in the ruins of Las Vegas. Mariette then brings K to meet Freysa personally.

Doc Badger

Doc Badger (Barkhad Abdi) is a street-wise fixer on the black market, who talks in Somali. After obtaining a wooden horse that was in his allegedly fake implanted memory, K goes to Doc Badger's shop to have it analyzed. Badger is surprised that it is made of real wood (which is worth a fortune), and on chemical analysis, discerns that it was exposed to high radiation levels – allowing K to narrow down his search to the ruins of Las Vegas.

Mister Cotton

Mister Cotton (Lennie James) runs a combination orphanage and salvaging operation in the vast junkyards on the outskirts of Los Angeles, putting the children to work picking apart piles of e-waste for useful scrap-metal. K's investigation leads him to discover that Rachael's child was passed off as a human child at Cotton's orphanage, though he does not remember it. K strong-arms him into revealing his records books, only to discover that someone stole the pages from that year to destroy the evidence.

Lt. Joshi 

Lt. Joshi (Robin Wright) is K's superior on the police force. She does not think replicants like K are as "real" as humans like her, though she does respect K. She is brutally killed by Luv after refusing to reveal K's location.

Coco 

Coco (David Dastmalchian) is a police forensics investigator. He analyzes the ossuary that K found, revealing to him and Joshi that they belonged to a replicant female who died in childbirth (Rachael). Wallace's agent Luv later ambushes and kills him in his lab, to steal Rachael's skeletal remains and return them to Wallace for analysis.

Nandez

Nandez (Wood Harris) is another police investigator. He is disdainful of Coco's conclusion that Sapper Morton must have cared for Rachael's baby, though Coco points out that Morton clearly cared enough to give her a proper burial.

Notes 
: Replicant serial numbers cover the individual's series, gender, physical and mental levels, and incept date. However, Leon's serial number is an error, as it gives his incept date as April 17, 2017.

References 

Characters
Speculative fiction film characters lists
Lists of minor fictional characters